The 1959 Pan American Games were held in Chicago, Illinois, United States between August 28 and September 7, 1959.

Host city selection 

One city initially submitted a bid to host the 1959 Pan American Games that was recognized by the Pan American Sports Organization (PASO), along with three cities that withdrew their bids. On March 11, 1955, at the IV Pan American Congress in Mexico City, PASO selected Cleveland unanimously to host the III Pan American Games.

On April 15, 1957, Cleveland asked PASO to be relieved of their assignment as the host city. Subsequently, both Guatemala City and Rio de Janeiro informed PASO that they would not be able to host the games either. Two cities came forward as candidates host the games, Chicago and São Paulo, and on August 3, 1957, Chicago was selected over São Paulo by a vote of 13 to 6.

Organization
Once Chicago took over the game following Cleveland's withdrawal, there were 18 months left to organize the games. The games were held on-schedule nonetheless. The games were the first Pan American Games to be held in the  Northern Hemisphere's summer. The previous two editions were held in March.

The Games

The games opened on August 27, 1959, in sunny 90 °F (32 °C) heat before 40,000 people in Chicago, Illinois, United States at Soldier Field.

Medal table

Sports and Venues

  at Soldier Field
  at Wrigley Field and Comiskey Park
  at Alumni Gymnasium (men's) and Oak Park High School (women's)
  at Northwest Armoury
  at Gately Stadium temporary venue (Track Cycling)
  at Portage Park
  (Open jumping)
  (soccer) at Hanson Stadium and Soldier Field
  at Navy Pier
  at Waukegan Shooting Range (shooting), Great Lakes Naval Training Center (fencing), Independence Grove (equestrian show-jumping and cross-country running), and Portage Park (swimming)
  in the Cal-Sag Channel
  in Lake Michigan
  at Portage Park
  at Lincoln Park Tennis Club
  at Proviso High School
 
  at Chicago Vocational High School
  at Reavis High School

References

External links
 Chicago 1959 - III Pan American Games - Official Report at PanamSports.org
 Chicago 1959 - III Pan American Games - Official Report (Part 2) at PanamSports.org